Donna Cornelia Brandolini d'Adda dei conti di Valmareno, better known as Coco Brandolini d'Adda, (born June 27, 1979) is a French-born Italian fashion executive, editor and socialite.

Early life and family 
Brandolini d'Adda was born on June 27, 1979 in Paris to Rodrigo Tiberto Brandolini d'Adda, Conte di Valmareno and Princess Georgine Maria Natividad de Faucigny-Lucinge et Coligny. Her paternal grandmother was Countess Cristiana Brandolini d'Adda, the sister of Gianni Agnelli and daughter of Edoardo Agnelli and Donna Virginia Bourbon del Monte (daughter of Carlo Bourbon del Monte, Prince di San Faustino). Her maternal grandfather was the French aristocrat Prince Jean-Louis de Faucigny-Lucinge and her maternal grandmother was Sylvia Régis de Oliveira, the only daughter of Raul Régis de Oliveira, a Brazilian diplomat who served as Brazil’s Ambassador to the United Kingdom from 1925 to 1939. She has a younger sister, Bianca Brandolini d'Adda. Two of her family's ancestral palaces, the Palazzo Brandolin Rota and the Palazzo Morosini Brandolin, are located on the Grand Canal in Venice. She grew up in Paris, but spent a lot of her youth at her paternal grandparents' estate in Vistorta. She went to university in Paris to study philosophy and political science.

Career 
Brandolini d'Adda was an intern at Harper's Bazaar before attending Central Saint Martins College of Art and Design in London. From 2001 to 2005, Brandolini d'Adda worked for Oscar de la Renta as a fashion consultant and design assistant. After working at Oscar de la Renta, she became a fashion consultant for Alberta Ferretti and Adam Lippes. She later was appointed Fashion Director at Tar Magazine and has worked as a fashion consultant for Tomas Maier at Bottega Veneta and at Nina Ricci. She later became an editor at Anew Magazine. Brandolini d'Adda worked as an artistic muse for Giambattista Valli. In 2012, Brandolini d'Adda, as head of the couture team, collaborated on Dolce & Gabbana's Alta Moda collection.

Personal life 
Brandolini d'Adda married Matteo Colombo in September 2008. The couple celebrated their civil ceremony with four hundred guests at the Italian Embassy in Paris. On September 27, 2008 the couple had a private religious wedding ceremony at a Catholic church in Vistorta, Italy. They have two daughters named Nina and Lea.

Brandolini d'Adda is the godmother of Margherita Missoni's son Otto Hermann Amos.

Brandolini d'Adda is noted for her personal style and is frequently photographed attending high society functions and fashion events.

References

Living people
1979 births
Agnelli family
Bourbon del Monte family
Coco
Alumni of Central Saint Martins
Fashion editors
Nobility from Paris
French people of Brazilian descent
French magazine editors
French women editors
House of Faucigny
Italian countesses
Italian magazine editors
Italian women editors
French emigrants to Italy
Fashion designers from Paris
French fashion designers
French women fashion designers
Italian fashion designers
Italian women fashion designers